Standard Printing Company, also known as the Hayward Grocery Company, is a historic commercial building located at Hannibal, Marion County, Missouri.  It was built in 1879, and is a three-story, nine bay by ten bay, Italianate style brick structure. It features segmental arched windows, a lavish bracketed and modillioned cornice, and a storefront with intact cornice and iron pilasters.

It was added to the National Register of Historic Places in 1986.

References

Commercial buildings on the National Register of Historic Places in Missouri
Italianate architecture in Missouri
Commercial buildings completed in 1879
Buildings and structures in Hannibal, Missouri
National Register of Historic Places in Marion County, Missouri